Jaime Perczyk (born 21 January 1964) is an Argentine educator and politician, currently serving as Argentina's Minister of Education since 20 September 2021, in the cabinet of President Alberto Fernández. Perczyk previously served as Secretary of University Policies under his predecessor Nicolás Trotta, and as Secretary of Education from 2011 to 2015, under Alberto Sileoni.

Perczyk graduated with a licenciatura on physical education from the National University of Luján, before specializing on Social Sciences and Humanities at the National University of Quilmes. His work at the Ministry of Education during the presidency of Cristina Fernández de Kirchner is noted for his contributions to the Conectar Igualdad and Educ.Ar programmes. From 2015 to 2019, he was rector of the National University of Hurlingham (UNAHur).

On 20 September 2021, Perczyk was appointed as Minister of Education in replacement of Nicolás Trotta as part of a cabinet reshuffle, following the government's poor showings in the 2021 legislative primary elections.

References

External links

|-

|-

1964 births
Living people
Argentine educators
Argentine ministers of education
21st-century Argentine politicians